The black beret is a colour of beret, a type of headgear. It is commonly worn by paramilitaries and militaries around the world, particularly armored forces such as the British Army's Royal Tank Regiment (RTR), the Royal Canadian Armoured Corps (RCAC), and Royal Australian Armoured Corps (RAAC) and the Indian Army Armoured Corps. Notable non-armored military units to wear the black beret include the non-military police and non-special forces elements of the Irish Defence Forces, MOD Guard Service, Russian Naval Infantry (and formerly Soviet) and Russian OMON units, the United States Air Force (USAF) Tactical Air Control Party (TACP), Philippine National Police-Special Action Force (PNP-SAF) members, and the Royal Canadian Navy ("navy blue"). It was also worn by the United Kingdom's Royal Observer Corps (ROC) with their Royal Air Force (RAF) uniform, Metropolitan Manila Development Authority (MMDA).

Black berets are also worn by navies. In some navies, the naval color called black is officially "very dark blue". The Dutch Navy and Marines wear dark navy blue berets; a silver anchor for the Navy and a gold or dark brown (field duty) anchor on a red background for the Marines. The Portuguese Marines and San Marco Regiment, the Marines of the Italian Navy also wear a dark blue beret. The Royal Norwegian Air Force also use a dark blue beret. Finnish Marine Infantry wear a dark blue beret with the Navy insignia.(Finnish Coastal Jaegers - marine commandos - part of the same Nylands Brigade, wear the green beret).

Perhaps the most famous Commonwealth wearer of the black beret was Field Marshal Montgomery who wore a Royal Tank Regiment (RTR) beret complete with cap badge, presented to him by the regiment, to which he added his own general's (later field marshal's) rank insignia.

History
The black beret has its origins with the French 70th Chasseurs Alpins who influenced the British Royal Tank Corps beginning in 1918. General Sir Hugh Jamieson Elles, together with Colonel Fuller came up with the idea of a black beret for the Royal Tank Corps. Black was selected as the colour because it was least likely to show oil stains, something which tank crewmen of that time (and now) could appreciate. It was approved for wear with the Royal Tank Corps by HM King George V on 5 March 1924.

The black beret remained the exclusive distinctive headdress of the Royal Tank Corps in 1940.

When uniforms were issued to the Royal Observer Corps there was a surplus of Royal Armoured Corps black berets that were given to the unit.

Usage by country

Argentina
The Argentine Navy's Batallón de Infantería de Marina 5 (5th Marine Battalion), of Falklands War Mount Tumbledown fame (1982), wears a black beret. This was introduced by (then) Commander Manuel Tomé around 1977, and the beret was awarded on completion of a Cold Weather and Mountain Warfare Course. Today, all units of the Southern Marine Force of the Argentine Marine Corps wear black berets with unit badges.

Australia
In the Australian Army, All RAAC Units (Royal Australian Armoured Corps), wear the black beret.

Austria
In the Austrian Bundesheer all armored units (Armored Battalions, Mechanized Infantry Battalions, Artillery Battalions and Mechanized Headquarter Battalions), wear the black beret.

Azerbaijan

In the Azerbaijani Armed Forces armored units of underwater offence of Azerbaijani Navy wear the black beret.

Bangladesh
In the Bangladesh Army, all units of the Armoured, Cavalry and Lancer Corps wear black berets.

Belgium
In the Belgian Army, the black beret is worn by cavalry and engineer units.

Brazil
The Brazilian armour and mechanized troops also wear the black beret, as well as the special forces unit of the Military Police of Rio de Janeiro, Batalhão de Operações Policiais Especiais (BOPE).

In the Brazilian auxiliary military forces of the Polícia Militar (Military Police), specially in Minas Gerais state, officers sometimes wears black berets as official parts of patrol gear.

Canada
In the Canadian Armed Forces, black berets are worn by Royal Canadian Armoured Corps soldiers and by all sailors (except military police and special operations sailors).

Chile
In the Chilean Army, the black beret is worn by the paras and the special forces.

Croatia
In the Croatian Army black berets are worn by military police units, 1st Mechanized Battalion and the Cadet Battalion.

Cuba 
Special unit of the police.

Cyprus
In the Cypriot National Guard, the black beret is exclusively given to soldiers of the Armoured Forces and to Officers of the same branch after graduating from the Greek Armoured Forces officers' school. The school is considered the toughest academy of the Greek Army, bar special forces, and therefore the black beret is considered an honour for the bearer.

Czech Republic
In the Czech Army, military policemen wear black berets.

Denmark
In the Danish Army, the black beret was originally used by all combat regiments, but now it is worn by Jutland Dragoons, Guard Hussars, Royal Life Guard, Army Combat and Fire Support Center, Garnisonskommandant Vordingborg and 1st Danish Artillery Battalion

Finland
Only members of the Armored Brigade wear black berets.

Germany
In the German Army, an oversized black beret was introduced during the National Socialist era for tank crews, to be worn over the crash helmet; however this was dropped in favour of a black garrison cap during World War II. Today the black beret (of conventional size) is worn by the Armoured Corps and the Armoured Reconnaissance Corps.

Greece
In the Greek Army, black berets are worn by the Panzer (Armored Vehicles) branch, tracing back to the tradition of the original cavalry units.

India
In the Indian Army,  all Cavalry and Armoured Corps, National Security Guards & Border Security Force wear black berets.

Indonesia
In the Indonesian Army, black beret is worn by the members of Cavalry Corps (except cavalry battalions under Kostrad strategic reserve command which wearing dark green beret universal to all of its soldiers).

In the Indonesian Navy, members of the Submarine Corps wear black berets.

Iraq
In the pre-2003 Iraqi Army, the black beret was the most commonly worn headgear and continues to be worn by both army and police personnel of the post-2003 Iraqi Army.

Ireland
In the Irish Army the majority of the members of the Permanent Defence Forces, specifically the infantry, wear black berets except for certain combat support units such as MPs, Cavalry etc.

Israel
In the Israel Defense Forces, soldiers serving in the Armor Corps wear black berets.

Italy
In the Italian Army most units wear a black beret. Exceptions are: Paratroopers, Alpini, Army Aviation Corps (AVES), Lagunari and Bersaglieri.

Luxembourg
The black beret is worn by all soldiers in the Luxembourg Army.

Lithuania
The black beret is worn by Juozas Vitkus Engineer battalion soldiers in the Lithuanian Armed Forces.

Malaysia
In the Malaysian Army, the members of the Royal Armor Corps wear the black berets.

Namibia
In the Namibian Army, the black beret is worn  by members from Artillery Brigade, Engineer Regiment, Signal Regiment, Logistic Support Battalion, Air Defence Brigade, the Namibian Air Force and Namibian Navy also wear the black beret

Nigeria
In the Nigerian Air Force , the black beret is worn by Nigerian airforce regiment and Navy personnel

Netherlands
In the Dutch Army, the black beret is worn by cavalry battalions.

New Zealand
In the New Zealand Police, members of the Armed Offenders Squad wore the black beret.

Non-state actors

One of the most famous photographs of Che Guevara taken by Alberto Korda was of him wearing a black beret with a gold star. Fidel Castro also wore a black beret during the revolution against the Batista government of Cuba. In the 1960s several activist groups adopted the beret.

 The Black Panther Party, of the United States formed in 1966, wore black berets.
 A similar Black Power organisation in Bermuda was named the Black Beret Cadre.
 Chicano activists wore the black beret in the 1960s and 70s (in homage to Che Guevara) as a symbol of militancy and organized the Black Berets por La Justicia throughout California and the Southwestern United States.
 Irish National Liberation Army members wore a black beret.
 Patriotic League of the Republic of Bosnia and Herzegovina members typically wore black berets (among other colours) that were common among the older Bosniak male population, usually with the Ljiljani coat of arms stitched on the front of the beret. It was also common among other Bosniak paramilitary forces during the Bosnian War.
 Provisional Irish Republican Army members wore a black beret.
 ETA wore black berets over hoods in public appearances.
 THRUSH troops on The Man from UNCLE wore black berets.
 Since August 2017, the Knights of Columbus Fourth Degree members are now wearing black berets as part of their new uniform.

Norway
The Norwegian Army Panserbataljonen (armoured) and other cavalry units wear black berets.

Philippines
In the Philippine Army, the members of the 1st Scout Ranger Regiment, Presidential Security Group and Tank Officers from the Philippine Army Light Armor Division

In the Philippine Air Force, members of the Special Operations Wing wears black berets.

In the Philippine National Police, members of the Special Action Force wears black berets.

In the Metropolitan Manila Development Authority, members of the Traffic Enforcers wears black berets.

Pakistan
In the Pakistan Army, the Armoured Corps wears black berets as well as special forces.

Poland
In the Polish Armed Forces, the black berets are worn by armored units of Polish Army, and by Polish Navy.

Portugal
In the Portuguese Army, the black beret is worn by the cavalry branch, including the armoured troops and the military police. The black beret is also worn by several Portuguese civil forces, like the Bomb disposal unit of the Public Security Police, the Prison Guard Corps and the Civil Defense.

Russia
Both the Russian Naval Infantry and OMON special police wears the black beret with its dress and field uniforms, when not wearing helmets.

Serbia
Members of the Serbian military police wear black berets.

Singapore
The black beret is worn by the Armour formation of the Singapore Armed Forces (SAF).

Spain
Traditionally in the Spanish Armed Forces black berets were used to denote paratroopers units. The custom originating in the Spanish Air Force, although it is now used also by other non-paratroopers units in the Army and the Air Force.

In the Spanish Army, the black beret is worn by the Mechanized Brigades and the Parachutist Brigade BRIPAC.

In the Spanish Air Force, the black beret is worn by the paratroopers units, the Air Deployment Support Squads EADA and SEADA, as well as by Air Force Police Units. The special operations unit EZAPAC used to wear the black beret until 1997 that was change to a Green Beret, to denote their Special Forces specialization.

Somalia 
In the Somali Army, members of the Armoured Battalions and the Army's rear wear a black beret, inherited from British military tradition.

In the Somali Navy, the black beret is the standard issue headgear.

South Africa
In the South African Army, members of the South African Armour Corps, the South African Intelligence Corps, Defence Intelligence Division and the Technical Service Corps wear the black beret, each with their respective corps badge.

Members of the South African Navy Maritime Reaction Squadron also wear the black beret.

South Korea
In the South Korean army, black berets are worn by South Korean army special operations forces.

Sri Lanka

In the Sri Lankan Army, the Armoured Corps, Mechanized Infantry and the Special Forces wear black berets.

In the Sri Lankan Navy, the black beret is worn by the Members of the elite Special Boat Squadron.

Sweden
In the Swedish Army, all armour and mechanized units wear black berets.

Switzerland
In the Swiss Army, black berets are worn by Tank Branch, Pioneers, Rescue Troops, Communication and Command Troops, high command, Tank Grenadiers, Chaplains, armed forces legal service and other troops.

Turkey

In the Turkish Land Forces, the black berets are worn by armor personnel.

United Kingdom 

In the United Kingdom's Ministry of Defence the Ministry of Defence Guard Service don a very dark blue beret.

United States
In the United States military, the beret was unofficially worn by a variety of special operations units during and following World War II. In the spring of 1951, the 10th and 11th Ranger Companies wore black berets during their training at Camp Carson, Colorado, before their deployment to Japan.

U.S. Air Force 

In 1979, the black beret was authorized for wear by enlisted personnel in the Tactical Air Control Party (TACP). In 1984, two airmen from Pope Air Force Base, North Carolina submitted the current flash and badge design. It was approved for all TACP airmen in 1985. TACP specialists (AFSC 1C4X1) are currently the only United States Air Force specialty allowed to wear the coveted black beret as part of their daily duty uniform wear.

U.S. Army 

In 1973, permission was granted to local commanders to encourage distinctive, morale-enhancing uniform items and the black beret was adopted by armor and armored cavalry units in the United States.

A black beret was authorized for wear by female soldiers in 1975.

On January 30, 1975, it was officially assigned as part of the newly created battalions of United States Army Rangers who had worn it unofficially during the Vietnam War.

In 1979, the U.S. Army Chief of Staff ruled that the black beret was restricted to just ranger and airborne units (the latter receiving their distinctive maroon berets on November 28, 1980). However, since June 14, 2001, the black beret is worn by all United States Army troops unless the soldier is approved to wear a different distinctive beret. The Rangers now wear tan berets, alluding to the buckskins worn by Rogers' Rangers during the French and Indian War.

The black beret is worn as part of the Army Service Uniform (ASU), the U.S. Army's dress uniform. It also became the official garrison headgear to be worn with the Battle Dress Uniform (BDUs) in 2001, and from 2005 the Army Combat Uniform (ACU). The change was implemented by General Eric Shinseki, Army Chief of Staff at the time, who stated that it was about promoting "...our values as an institution."  From the beginning, the beret was unpopular with soldiers because the headgear required two hands to put it on, provided no shade from the sun (unlike the patrol cap), had to be shaved and shaped upon acquisition and, as black wool, was hot and uncomfortable in warm weather.

Despite years of negative feedback, the beret remained part of the ACU until 2011, when incoming Sergeant Major of the Army Raymond F. Chandler made it his first order of business to address the wishes "thousands of soldiers" who wanted the army to end the wear of the beret with the ACU, and the army subsequently did just that. The black beret remained the headgear for the ASU, but was replaced as the default headgear with the ACU patrol cap.

U.S. Navy 

During the Vietnam War U.S. Navy personnel assigned to patrol boats and members of Inshore Undersea Warfare Group 1, WESTPAC Division wore the South Vietnamese navy black beret with badge.  Unlike the U.S. Navy SEAL teams, the beret was authorized for wear In Country only. Unit tradition had the back ribbon cut into two pennants after first contact with the enemy with the ends of the pennant notched in a "V" to signify he had made an enemy "kill".

Until October 2016, a black beret was authorized to be worn in the U.S. Navy, albeit solely by female sailors of all pay-grades. Female commissioned officers wore the U.S. Navy officer crest on the beret above the left eyebrow, female petty officers and seamen wore the combination cover's device, and female chief petty officers wore their rate insignia instead. The female black beret's usage was discontinued along with the officer's tiara by the navy in 2016 as part of a naval effort to reduce the number of uniform items, make them appear more unisex, and also due to a lack of widespread use.

Ukraine 

The Ukrainian Marines formerly wore, and were known as the "Black Berets" until 2018.

Venezuela
In the Venezuelan Army, black berets are of general use except for Paratroopers, Special Forces, Counter-insurgency troops and soldiers stationed inside the Ministry of Defence and Army headquarters.

See also

Beret
Military beret
Uniform beret, for the use of berets as uniform headgear outside the military
Military berets by color
Green beret
Maroon beret
Red beret
Tan beret

References

Berets
Clothing in politics